In Greek mythology, Periphas (Ancient Greek: Περίφας, Períphās "conspicuousness") was a legendary king of Attica, whom Zeus turned into an eagle. Aside from a passing reference in Ovid's Metamorphoses, the only known source for this story is the second century  AD or later Metamorphoses of  Antoninus Liberalis.

Mythology 
In a time, before Cecrops, who was traditionally recorded to be the first king of Athens, the earth born (autochthon) Periphas ruled over Attica. He was a pious priest of Apollo, to whom Periphas made many sacrifices, and he was a just king, whose "fair judgments" were numerous. Periphas was above reproach and his rule was accepted willingly by all. But Periphas was so loved by his people that they paid him the honors which belonged to Zeus alone, building temples to Periphas and calling him Zeus Soter ("Saviour"), and Epopsios ("Overlooker of All")  and Meilichios ("Gracious"). Being indignant Zeus was determined to strike Periphas with a thunderbolt and consume Periphas and his entire household by fire, but because Periphas had been so faithful, Apollo asked Zeus to spare Periphas, and Zeus agreed.  So instead Zeus came down into the house of Periphas, found Periphas in the arms of his wife Phene, and turned Periphas into an eagle. Because Phene begged Zeus to make her a bird also, as a companion for Periphas, Zeus turned her into a vulture. And Zeus made Periphas the king of all birds, placed him as guard over his sacred sceptre, and to Phene, the vulture, he granted that she become a good omen for men in all endeavors.

According to Arthur Bernard Cook, the story of Periphas is part of a tradition whereby an early king posing as Zeus is punished by Zeus, often by being changed into a bird.

See also
 Aetos Dios

Notes

References
 Antoninus Liberalis, The Metamorphoses of Antoninus Liberalis translated by Francis Celoria (Routledge 1992). Online version at the Topos Text Project.
Celoria, Francis, The Metamorphoses of Antoninus Liberalis: A Translation with Commentary, Edited and translated by Francis Celoria, Psychology Press, 1992. 
 Cook, Arthur Bernard (1904), "The European Sky-god II" in Folklore, 15, pp. 369–426.
 Cook, Arthur Bernard (1925), Zeus: A Study in Ancient Religion, Volume II: Zeus God of the Dark Sky (Thunder and Lightning), Part II: Appendixes and Index, Cambridge University Press 1925. Internet Archive
 Ovid. Metamorphoses, Volume I: Books 1-8. Translated by Frank Justus Miller. Revised by G. P. Goold. Loeb Classical Library No. 42. Cambridge, Massachusetts: Harvard University Press, 1916. Online version at Harvard University Press.
 Smith, William; Dictionary of Greek and Roman Biography and Mythology, London (1873). Online version at the Perseus Digital Library

Autochthons of classical mythology
Kings of Athens
Kings in Greek mythology
Metamorphoses into birds in Greek mythology
Attican characters in Greek mythology
Deeds of Zeus
Deeds of Apollo